The Bayer designation Rho Cephei (ρ Cephei / ρ Cep) is shared by two stars in the constellation Cepheus:
ρ1 Cephei
ρ2 Cephei

Cepheus (constellation)
Cephei, Rho